Marine radars are X band or S band radars on ships, used to detect other ships and land obstacles, to provide bearing and distance for collision avoidance and navigation at sea.  They are electronic navigation instruments that use a rotating antenna to sweep a narrow beam of microwaves around the water surface surrounding the ship to the horizon, detecting targets by microwaves reflected from them, generating  a picture of the ship's surroundings on a display screen.  

Radar is a vital navigation component for safety at sea and near the shore. Captains need to be able to maneuver their ships within feet in the worst of conditions and to be able to navigate "blind", when there is no visibility at night or due to bad weather.  In addition to vessel-based marine radars, in port or in harbour, shore-based vessel traffic service radar systems are used by harbormasters and coast guard to monitor and regulate ship movements in busy waters.
  
Radars are rarely used alone in a marine setting.   A modern trend is the integration of radar with other navigation displays on a single screen, as it becomes quite distracting to look at several different screens.  Therefore, displays can often overlay an electronic GPS navigation chart of ship position, and a sonar display, on the radar display.  This provides a combined view of surroundings, to maneuver the ship.  

In commercial ships, radars are integrated into a full suite of marine instruments including chartplotters, sonar, two-way marine radio, satellite navigation (GNSS) receivers such as the US Global Positioning System (GPS),  and emergency locators (SART).   With digital data buses to exchange data, these devices advanced greatly in the early 21st century.  For example, some have 3D displays that allow navigators to see above, below and all around the ship, including overlays of satellite imaging.

Collision avoidance
As required by COLREGS, all ships shall maintain a proper radar lookout if it is available on board to obtain early warning of risk of collision. Radar plotting with the use of an EBL and VRM, or the ARPA should be used to get the information of movement and the risk of collision (bearing, distance, CPA (closest point of approach), TCPA (time of closest point of approach) of other ships in vicinity.

Navigation
Marine radar systems can provide very useful radar navigation information for navigators on board ships.   The ship's position could be fixed by the bearing and distance information of a fixed, reliable target on the radar screen.

Radar controls
Marine radar has performance adjustment controls for brightness and contrast, also manual or automatic adjustment of gain, tuning, sea clutter and rain clutter suppression, and interference reduction.  Other common controls consist of range scale, bearing cursor, fix/variable range marker (VRM) or bearing/distance cursor (EBL).

References

External links
Calculatoredge.com
Radartutorial.eu
Earth.esa.int
Alphalpha.org
Macuait.com
Radar in the 21st Century

Sea radars
Navigational aids